Xenon tetroxide is a chemical compound of xenon and oxygen with molecular formula XeO4, remarkable for being a relatively stable compound of a noble gas. It is a yellow crystalline solid that is stable below −35.9 °C; above that temperature it is very prone to exploding and decomposing into elemental xenon and oxygen (O2).

All eight valence electrons of xenon are involved in the bonds with the oxygen, and the oxidation state of the xenon atom is +8. Oxygen is the only element that can bring xenon up to its highest oxidation state; even fluorine can only give XeF6 (+6).

Two other short-lived xenon compounds with an oxidation state of +8, XeO3F2 and XeO2F4, are accessible by the reaction of xenon tetroxide with xenon hexafluoride. XeO3F2 and XeO2F4 can be detected with mass spectrometry. The perxenates are also compounds where xenon has the +8 oxidation state.

Reactions
At temperatures above −35.9 °C, xenon tetroxide is very prone to explosion, decomposing into xenon and oxygen gases with ΔH = −643 kJ/mol:

XeO4 → Xe + 2 O2

Xenon tetroxide dissolves in water to form perxenic acid and in alkalis to form perxenate salts:

XeO4 + 2 H2O → H4XeO6
XeO4 + 4 NaOH → Na4XeO6 + 2 H2O

Xenon tetroxide can also react with xenon hexafluoride to give xenon oxyfluorides:

XeO4 + XeF6 → XeOF4 + XeO3F2
XeO4 + 2XeF6 → XeO2F4 + 2 XeOF4

Synthesis
All syntheses start from the perxenates, which are accessible from the xenates through two methods. One is the disproportionation of xenates to perxenates and xenon:
 2  + 2 OH− →  + Xe + O2 + 2 H2O

The other is oxidation of the xenates with ozone in basic solution:

  + O3 + 3 OH− →  + O2 + 2 H2O

Barium perxenate is reacted with sulfuric acid and the unstable perxenic acid is dehydrated to give xenon tetroxide:

  + 2  → 2  + 
  → 2  + 

Any excess perxenic acid slowly undergoes a decomposition reaction to xenic acid and oxygen:

 2  →  + 2  + 2

References

 

Xenon(VIII) compounds
Inorganic compounds
Oxides